Tonis, Tõnis or Tönis is a masculine given name. Tõnis is an Estonian form of Anthony. Tönis is a Dutch and Swedish form of Tönnis and diminutive form of Antonius, Anton, Antoon, Anthonis, Anthoon, Antonie and Antonis. Tonis is a Dutch diminutive form of Antonius, Anton, Antoon, Anthonis, Anthoon, Antonie and Antonis. Tonis is a Lithuanian diminutive form of Antanas. Another variant of Tõnis in Estonian is Tõnu. It is also a surname. Persons bearing the name included:

Given name
 Tõnis Kaasik (born 1949), Estonian entrepreneur, fencer, environmentalist, and politician
 Tõnis Kalbus (1880–1942), Estonian lawyer and politician
 Tõnis Kalde (born 1976), Estonian football player
 Tõnis Kasemets (born 1974), Estonian race car driver
 Tõnis Kask (1929–2016), Estonian director
 Tõnis Kimmel (born 1977), Estonian architect
 Tõnis Kint (1896–1991), Estonian politician
 Tõnis Kõiv (born 1970), Estonian politician
 Tõnis Lukas (born 1962), Estonian politician
 Tõnis Mägi (born 1948), Estonian musician
 Tõnis Mölder (born 1989), Estonian politician
 Tõnis Palts (born 1953), Estonian businessman and politician
 Tõnis Rätsep (born 1947), Estonian actor, musician, playwright, and educator
 Tõnis Rotberg (1882–1953), Estonian army general
 Tõnis Sahk (born 1983), Estonian long jumper
 Tõnis Seesmaa (born 1955), Estonian politician and engineer
 Tõnis Vint (1942–2019), Estonian artist

Surname
Mike Tonis (born 1979), American baseball player

References

Estonian masculine given names